Augusto Monti (29 August 1881 in Monastero Bormida – 11 July 1966 in Rome) was an Italian writer and professor.

Strenuous opposer of fascism since its beginning, he was imprisoned by the regime. During the 2nd post-war he became an important representative of the world of Italian literature and of the pedagogy. He taught at Liceo Classico Massimo d'Azeglio in Turin. Among his students there were Cesare Pavese, Giulio Einaudi, Leone Ginzburg, Norberto Bobbio, and Massimo Mila.

References

External links 
  Deepening by "Comunità Montana Langa delle Valli"
  Comment about Augusto Monti and first page of his novel (in original language) I Sansôssí on  L'ANCORA settimanale di informazione

Italian anti-fascists
1881 births
1966 deaths
Italian Freemasons